Mehmed Riza Pasha or Serasker Riza Pasha (1844–1920) was an Ottoman military commander. He reached the rank of Serasker, which was the highest military rank of the Ottoman Empire. He participated in the Russo-Turkish War (1877–78).

Biography 

Born in a family of Turkish origin. He was promoted to Serasker by Sultan Abdul Hamid II. The house that was owned by the Pasha can still be found on the Bosphorous.

He was exiled to live in France following the end of the Ottoman Dynasty. He would have three sons: Sureyya Pasha, Ziya Bey and Sukru Bey. Ziya Bey went with his father to France, where they lived in Nice. The home in Nice still bears a plaque to show his habitation of the property.

He had a grip upon the Ottoman Empire as the Sultan by all accounts was weak, having inherited the title from his brother Abdülaziz.

He is buried in the courtyard where the tomb of Mahmud II is located as well as other notable gentlemen of that period.

In 1867, he graduated from Mekteb-i Harbiye with the rank of Mülâzımı. At the command of the 2nd Army, the 1st Regiment in Shumen was assigned to the 3rd Battalion and 4th Division. He came to Istanbul with his battalion to be sent to Crete. At the Ministry of War, he was assigned to train the newly recruited rifles. With the newly purchased rifles, the soldiers had training in Crete. Due to his successful and outstanding work, he attracted the attention of the Governor and Commander of Crete Muşir Omar Pasha and was appointed as the chief master. However, two or three days later he resigned and returned to Istanbul.

In 1870 he was promoted to the rank of captain. In 1871, he took part in the suppression of the Malisör Rebellion in Shkodra. He took part in Şahin Pasha's retinue in the reorganization of the School of Medicine in 1874.

In 1875 he was promoted to the rank of major. Upon the outbreak of the Montenegrin rebellion, he was assigned as the deputy battalion commander in Muğla in Trebin. Müşir Süleyman Hüsnü Pasha joined his entourage in the 93 War.

During the war, he was promoted to the rank of Kaymakam by Süleyman Hüsnü Pasha for his outstanding services and was awarded the Order of the Medjidie of the 4th rank. He was captured by the Russian Army during the Battle of Shipka Pass. After 6 months he returned to Istanbul. Due to his good relations with Süleyman Pasha, who was detained in Istanbul, he was appointed to Liva Attorney General under the command of Emin Pasha, who was injured in Kosovo. When Emin Pasha was on the Greek border, he went to Yenişehir. During the collision with the Greeks in Yenişehir, he resigned from the military when he received a telegram from his family in Istanbul asking him to search his home. Circassian gave up his resignation at the request of Abdi Pasha.

In 1881 he was promoted to the rank of Miralay and was appointed as the Commander of the Izmit Redif Regiment. In 1885, upon the events in Cisr-i Mustafapaşa, he transferred to Edirne with his regiment. When the place of duty was reacted by the soldiers, he was immediately summoned to the Yildiz Palace in Istanbul. Sultan II. Abdulhamid. After this meeting, Sultan II. Abdulhamid was ordered to be promoted to the rank of Mirliva by Seraskery and continued his duty in Edirne.

He was the commander of Fırka in Edirne between 1885-1888. In 1888 he was called to Istanbul and II. Abdulhamid was assigned to the command of the 2nd Firka tasked with the guard. II. Abdulhamid's attention. On 3 September 1891 he was promoted to the rank of Ferik and then to the rank of Mushir and appointed as Serasker. From September 5, 1891 to July 23, 1908, he served as a serasker.

He died in 1920.

References 

1844 births
1920 deaths
Ottoman Army generals
Field marshals of the Ottoman Empire